In Microsoft operating systems, when using basic disk partitioned with GUID Partition Table (GPT) layout, a basic data partition (BDP) is any partition identified with Globally Unique Identifier (GUID) of .

A basic data partition can be formatted with any file system, although most commonly BDPs are formatted with the NTFS, exFAT, or FAT32 file systems.  To programmatically determine which file system a BDP contains, Microsoft specifies that one should inspect the BIOS Parameter Block that is contained in the BDP's Volume Boot Record.

When a Microsoft operating system converts a GPT-partitioned basic disk to a dynamic disk, all BDPs are combined and converted to a single Logical Disk Manager data partition identified with GUID .

Linux used the same partition type GUID for basic data partition as Windows prior to introduction of a Linux specific Data Partition GUID .

References

See also 
 Disk partitioning
 EFI system partition (ESP), a reserved partition on GPT disk
 Microsoft Reserved Partition (MSR), a reserved partition on GPT disk

Disk file systems
Disk partitions